Amantes de luna llena (English title: Full Moon Lovers) is a Venezuelan telenovela written by Leonardo Padrón and produced by Venevisión in 2000.

On August 22, 2000, Venevisión started broadcasting Amantes de luna llena weekdays at 9:00pm, replacing Hechizo de amor. The last episode was broadcast on March 26, 2001.

Ruddy Rodríguez and Diego Bertie starred as the main protagonists while Beatriz Valdés and Jorge Cao starred as antagonists, with special participation of Gianella Neyra.

Plot
Across the city, a legend spreads of a man that sets women on fire and that he is a true master of exploring the feminine body. This man is Simón Luna, the most celebrated tourist guide responsible for taking vacationers to some of the most exotic locations in Venezuela. But one thing about Simón is that he has never truly fallen in love with any woman. But this will change with the appearance of Camila Rigores, a beautiful woman with an overpowering personality who is the daughter of Leon Rigores, owner of the biggest hotel in the capital. Camila has returned to Venezuela with the aim of managing her father's hotel, El Durado and revitalizing the tourism industry in the country.

However, a tragedy occurs when her sister Isabel commits suicide due to unrequited love. In order to avenge her sister's death, Camila begins the search for the man that led her sister to commit suicide, and that man is none other than Simón. Camila draws out her plan for vengeance: she will seduce Simón and make him fall in love with her.

Simón, who is unaware of Isabel's death, will be greatly affected by the appearance of Camila into his life and in one of the most impressive locations of nature in Venezuela. Camila makes Simón her business partner, and the two will begin the game of seduction that will ruin both of them.

Cast

 Ruddy Rodríguez as Camila Rigores
 Diego Bertie as Simón Luna
 Astrid Carolina Herrera as La Perla
 Carlos Mata as Alejandro Linares
 Juan Carlos Vivas as El Siete
 Gaby Espino as Abril Cárdenas
 Nohely Arteaga as Micaela Lugo
 Rosalinda Serfaty as Valentina Linares
 Daniel Alvarado as Tony Calcaño
 Fabiola Colmenares as María Celeste "La Vikinga"
 Pablo Martín as Ruben Sucre
 Carlota Sosa as Renata Cárdenas
 Aroldo Betancourt as Facundo Montoya
 Lourdes Valera as Lupita Madera
 Milena Santander as Tata Calcaño
 Kiara as Lorena Santamaría
 Beatriz Valdés as Sol Rigores
 Jorge Cao as León Rigores
 Ana Karina Manco as Chocolate
 Yanis Chimaras as Lucho Cárdenas 
 Elisa Escámez as Custodia
 Roberto Lamarca as Troconis
 Adolfo Cubas as Macedonio
 Johanna Morales as Ximena
 Elaiza Gil as Rebeca
 Luis Gerónimo Abreu as Cristóbal
 Fernando Villate as Juan Chiquito
 Eva Moreno as Cruz María
 Isabel Moreno as Angustia
 Haydée Balza as Rosita Mérida
 Francisco Ferrari as Hipólito Linares
 Beatriz Vásquez as Meche Peralta
 Javier Varcarser as Kico
 Isabel Herrera as Trinidad
 Andreína Yépez as Tobago
 Carmen Manrique as Maruja
 Samantha Suárez as Carolina Linares
 Christina Dieckmann as Bárbara
 María Antonieta Duque as Angélica
 Marjorie de Sousa as Mayra
 Gianella Neyra as Isabel Rigores

References

External links
Amantes de Luna Llena (2000–2001) at Internet Movie Database
Amantes De Luna Llena / Venevision - 2000 at TVII

2000 telenovelas
Venevisión telenovelas
2000 Venezuelan television series debuts
Venezuelan telenovelas
2001 Venezuelan television series endings
Spanish-language telenovelas
Television shows set in Venezuela